Chips Deluxe is a brand of cookies made by the Keebler Company (a division of the Ferrara Candy Company, itself a subsidiary of Ferrero SpA) and distributed in the United States.

Varieties
Originally released as a chocolate chip cookies, the Chips Deluxe have evolved to other variations, also featuring M&M's multicolored chocolate candies.
 Original Chips Deluxe
 Rainbow Chips Deluxe
 Soft 'n' Chewy Chips Deluxe
 Chocolate Lovers Chips Deluxe
 Peanut Butter Cups Chips Deluxe
 Dark Chocolate Chunk Chips Deluxe
 Coconut Chips Deluxe
 Mini Rainbow Chips Deluxe
 Oatmeal Chips Deluxe

See also
Chips Ahoy!

References

External links
 

Kellogg's brands
Brand name cookies